Paul Dryden Barns (March 20, 1894 – September 22, 1973) was a justice of the Florida Supreme Court from December 2, 1946, to September 1, 1949.

Born in Plant City, Florida, Barns was an aerial gunner and then an aerial gunnery instructor in the United States Army Air Corps during World War I. He graduated from the University of Florida College of Law in 1920, and became a judge of the Dade Civil Court of Record in 1929, and then a circuit judge until his election to the Florida Supreme Court in 1946, to a seat vacated by the retirement of Justice Armstead Brown.

Barns "thoroughly disliked Tallahassee", but expressed a sense of civic obligation to continue in the position until his resignation in 1949. Barns then returned to private practice in Miami, also occasionally teaching at the University of Miami School of Law, and serving as a substitute judge by special appointment.

Barns died in Miami, Florida, from pulmonary fibrosis attributed to his military service.

References

Justices of the Florida Supreme Court
1894 births
1973 deaths
University of Florida alumni
United States Army personnel of World War I
Deaths from pulmonary fibrosis
20th-century American judges